Ortaçalı is a village of Elazığ District in Elazığ Province eastern Turkey. Its population is 176 (2021). The village is inhabited by the Kurdish Parçikan tribe.

The village is located to the west of Sivrice township and north of the river Euphrates. Its post code is 23350.

Earthquakes
In 2007 an earthquake of magnitude 3.5 occurred on Sunday, February 25, 2007, centered on the town.

Ortaçalı was also strongly impacted by the 2020 Elazığ earthquake.

References 

Villages in Elazığ District
Kurdish settlements in Elazığ Province